Brieskow-Finkenheerd is a municipality in the Oder-Spree district, in Brandenburg, Germany. It is located near the border with Poland.

Demography

Personalities 
 Heinrich Tessenow (1876-1950), architect, designed the settlement Glückauf in Brieskow-Finkenheerd

References

Localities in Oder-Spree